Joshua Travis Riddle (born October 12, 1991) is an American professional baseball shortstop and outfielder who is currently a free agent. He previously played in MLB for the Miami Marlins, Pittsburgh Pirates, Minnesota Twins and Cincinnati Reds. Prior to paying professionally, Riddle attended the University of Kentucky, where he played college baseball for the Wildcats.

Amateur career
Riddle attended Western Hills High School in Frankfort, Kentucky. He graduated in 2010. While playing for the school's baseball team, Riddle was named Mr. Kentucky Baseball. He then enrolled at the University of Kentucky, where he played college baseball for the Kentucky Wildcats. In 2012, he played collegiate summer baseball with the Orleans Firebirds of the Cape Cod Baseball League.

Professional career

Miami Marlins
The Miami Marlins selected Riddle in the 13th round of the 2013 Major League Baseball draft. He signed with Miami and began his professional career with the Batavia Muckdogs of the Class A-Short Season New York–Penn League. He spent all of 2013 there, batting .243 with two home runs and 18 RBIs in 59 games. He played for the Greensboro Grasshoppers of the Class A South Atlantic League in 2014 and batted .280 with nine home runs and 60 RBIs in 103 games. Riddle began the 2015 season with the Jupiter Hammerheads of the Class A-Advanced Florida State League, and after batting .270/.311/.314 in 45 games, received a midseason promotion to the Jacksonville Suns of the Class AA Southern League. In 44 games for Jacksonville he posted a .289 batting average with five home runs and 20 RBIs. After the 2015 season, the Marlins assigned Riddle to the Mesa Solar Sox of the Arizona Fall League.

In 2016, the Marlins invited Riddle to spring training. The Marlins added him to their 40-man roster after the season. He spent the season with both Jacksonville and the New Orleans Baby Cakes of the Class AAA Pacific Coast League, compiling a combined .276 batting average with four home runs and 53 RBIs in 116 games between both teams.

Riddle began 2017 with New Orleans, and was promoted to the major leagues on April 10. He recorded his first major league hit on April 12, on a checked swing infield single against the Atlanta Braves. On April 16, he hit a walk-off home run against the New York Mets, his first major league home run.

Following the trade of Adeiny Hechavarria in June, Riddle became the Marlins' primary shortstop. In mid-July Riddle tore a shoulder labrum, requiring season-ending surgery in August. He had batted .250 with a .282 on-base percentage, a .355 slugging percentage, three home runs, and 31 runs batted in in 70 games prior to his injury.

Riddle began 2018 on the disabled list and was optioned to New Orleans after he was activated. He was recalled to Miami on May 26. Riddle was non-tendered on December 2, 2019, and became a free agent.

Pittsburgh Pirates
On January 31, 2020, Riddle signed with the Pittsburgh Pirates. Overall with the 2020 Pittsburgh Pirates, Riddle batted .149 with one home run and 1 RBI in 23 games. Riddle was designated for assignment after the season on October 1, 2020, following the acquisition of Sean Poppen. Riddle was outrighted on October 5, but rejected the assignment in favor of free agency.

Minnesota Twins
On January 7, 2021, Riddle signed a minor league contract with the Minnesota Twins organization. On April 14, 2021, Riddle was selected to the active roster. On April 29, Riddle was designated for assignment after notching 2 hits in 6 at-bats. On May 3, Riddle was outrighted to the Triple-A St. Paul Saints. In 91 games for St. Paul, Riddle slashed .202/.269/.322 with 7 home runs and 40 RBI. On October 13, 2021, Riddle elected free agency.

Cincinnati Reds
On March 15, 2022, Riddle signed a minor league contract with the Cincinnati Reds. On April 19, 2022, Riddle has his contract selected to the major league roster. He was designated for assignment on April 24, 2022. He cleared waivers and was sent outright to the Triple-A Louisville Bats on April 28.

New York Mets

On May 29, 2022, Riddle was traded to the New York Mets for cash considerations. He was assigned to Triple-AAA Syracuse as a depth option. On October 13, Riddle elected to become a free agent.

References

External links

Living people
1991 births
People from Frankfort, Kentucky
Baseball players from Kentucky
Major League Baseball shortstops
Miami Marlins players
Pittsburgh Pirates players
Minnesota Twins players
Cincinnati Reds players
Kentucky Wildcats baseball players
Orleans Firebirds players
Batavia Muckdogs players
Greensboro Grasshoppers players
Jupiter Hammerheads players
Jacksonville Suns players
New Orleans Zephyrs players
Mesa Solar Sox players
New Orleans Baby Cakes players
St. Paul Saints players
Syracuse Mets players